Bordj Ghédir is a town and commune in Bordj Bou Arréridj Province, Algeria. According to the 1998 census it has a population of 23,289.

Notable people
 Mohamed Nadir Hamimid - Algerian politician
 Mohamed Tiaïba - Algerian footballer

References

Communes of Bordj Bou Arréridj Province